The Australia Men's Under-19 National Floorball Team is the men's under-19 national floorball team of Australia, and a member of the International Floorball Federation. The team is composed of the best Australian floorball players under the age of 19. The Australian under-19 men's team is currently ranked 20th in the world at floorball, and is currently prepping for the 2021 U-19 World Championships.

Roster 
As of October 15, 2019

Team Staff 
Head Coach - Carl Hammarlund 

Coach - Nicholas Moran 

Goalkeeper Coach - Ryan Alexandrakis 

Team Manager - Shane Abell 

Team Official - Bettina Lucini

Records

All-Time World Championship Records

Head-to-Head International Records

References 

Floorball in Australia